Star 947 (94.7 FM) is a radio station broadcasting from Trinidad and Tobago.

News 
The radio station provides news, through Newsfeed bulletins throughout the weekday. Along with 96 WEFM and 107.7 FM Music For Life, short news summaries are provided roughly hourly on the half-hour during the daytime hours.

The current bulletin times are as follows:

External links
Official website

See also
951 Remix
Hott 93

Radio stations in Trinidad and Tobago